USS De Grasse (ID-1217) was the projected name for an armed yacht that the United States Navy acquired for service as a patrol vessel in 1918 but, according to some sources, never commissioned, although other sources claim she saw brief naval service in 1918. In World War II, she was reacquired and served as YP-506. The yacht's official number was registered under the name Fleet as of 1959, fate unknown.

History 

De Grasse was under construction as a wooden-hulled, steam turbine-powered private yacht by George Lawley and Sons at Neponset, Massachusetts, for J. L. Redmond of New York City on 7 June 1917 when the U.S. Navy ordered her taken over for World War I service upon completion and assigned her the Naval Registry Identification Number (Id. No.) 1217. She was completed in 1918, and Commandant, 1st Naval District, took control of her on 18 July 1918 in anticipation of commissioning her as USS De Grasse.

On 27 July 1918, the Commandant received orders to have De Grasse inspected for naval service. Tests and sea trials quickly took place at the Boston Navy Yard in Boston, Massachusetts, and revealed, as stated in a report dated 31 July 1918, that De Grasse was "unseaworthy" and of "no value for naval operations."

Sources differ on whether De Grasse saw any naval service at all. Some say that she was commissioned in July 1918 and briefly served in coastal waters along the central portion of the United States East Coast, while others claim that the negative 31 July 1918 inspection report led to her never being commissioned or seeing naval service.

Directed on 17 August 1918 to return De Grasse to her owner, Commandant, 1st Naval District, returned her to Redmond on 7 November 1918 and provided him with $500 ($ today) "for restoration of [the] ship [to] its former condition."

De Grasse was reacquired in 1942 for service as a district patrol craft, YP-506. The former yacht was released from service in 1946 and was sold. The yacht's official number was registered with the US Coast Guard under the name Fleet as of 1959. After 1959, the yacht's fate is not known.

Notes

References

Department of the Navy: Naval Historical Center: Online Library of Selected Images: U.S. Navy Ships: USS De Grasse (ID # 1217), 1918-1918. Originally the civilian steam boat De Grasse (1918).
NavSource Online: Section Patrol Craft Photo Archive De Grasse (ID 1217)

Patrol vessels of the United States Navy
World War I patrol vessels of the United States
World War II patrol vessels of the United States
Ships built in Boston
Steam yachts
1918 ships